Year of the Tiger is the debut studio album by American musician and singer-songwriter Myles Kennedy. His first release as a solo artist, it was released on March 9, 2018, by Napalm Records. The album is a musical departure from the hard rock music of Kennedy's other projects, instead featuring a stripped-back blues-based sound. A concept album, it explores the death of Kennedy's father in 1974, the year of the Tiger in the Chinese calendar.

Critical reception

Initial reaction for Year of the Tiger from music critics has been highly favorable. Hannah May Kilroy of Classic Rock gave the album 4 out of 5 stars, writing, "essentially Year of the Tiger sounds like Alter Bridge relocated to the deep south—if they swapped their hard rock riffs for bluesy twangs" and "the final message is one of finding hope in the darkness, and it’s evident that making Year of the Tiger has been a therapeutic experience for Kennedy and should be celebrated." Cryptic Rock's Vito Lanzi gave the album a perfect 5-star rating, and commented that "with Year of the Tiger, Kennedy has really found his own individuality as a musician and is proud of his accomplishments." Daily Express writer Paul Davies was also positive towards the album, concluding that "As though created from the confessional booth of inward reflection and conveyed with brutal honesty, Kennedy gloriously rides the tiger across all the tracks with emotional and musical aplomb."

Loudwire's Chad Childers described the album as "not a Slash rehash or Alter Bridge minus Mark Tremonti" but as "a stellar, more nuanced and autobiographical release that shows the singer as an artist taking a risk, being his most vulnerable while telling a deeply personal tale of a tragedy from his youth that influenced and informed the rest of his life." Childers concluded that "While the album is about Kennedy's journey, it's one that is satisfying to us as listeners."

The Arts Desk's Russ Coffey was more critical of the album, giving it a three out of five stars, adding up that "there are plenty for whom this kind of folky hard rock is the absolute last word in ghastliness. But if you're a classic rock fan and you enjoy Kennedy's voice, you're unlikely to be disappointed with Year of the Tiger."

Track listing

Personnel
Taken from album liner notes.

 Myles Kennedy – vocals, guitar, banjo, lap steel, bass guitar, mandolin
 Zia Uddin – drums, percussion
 Tim Tournier – bass guitar
 Michael "Elvis" Baskette – keyboards, producer, mixing
 Jef Moll – engineering, digital editing
 Brad Blackwood - mastering
 Simon Dobson – string arrangement ("The Great Beyond")
 Will Harvey – violin ("The Great Beyond")
 Maddie Cutter – cello ("The Great Beyond")
 Elitsa Bogdanova – viola ("The Great Beyond")

Charts

References

2018 debut albums
Myles Kennedy albums
Napalm Records albums
Albums produced by Michael Baskette
Concept albums